The Breckenridge–Gordon House is located at 3611 Jackson Street in Midtown Omaha, Nebraska. Built in 1905, the house was designed by Thomas Rogers Kimball for a prominent local attorney. Designated as an Omaha Landmark in 1982, the residence is located in the Gold Coast Historic District, which is listed on the National Register of Historic Places.

Designed in the Georgian Revival style, the brick structure has three stories, an elegant front porch with a pediment and embellished Ionic columns. When the original owner was killed in an automobile accident, his daughter's new husband moved into the home. The Gordons sold it in 1947, and it was converted to apartments soon afterward.

References 

Houses completed in 1905
Houses on the National Register of Historic Places in Omaha, Nebraska
Omaha Landmarks
1905 establishments in Nebraska